Casa Pinyol is a building designed in Reus, Catalonia, Spain,  designed by the Modernist architect Pere Caselles i Tarrats.

The Casa Pinyol  was built in 1910. As of 2010 it is used as the head office of the Catalan party Convergència Democràtica de Catalunya in the city of Reus.

See also
Reus
Modernisme

Modernisme architecture in Reus
Buildings and structures in Reus
Buildings and structures completed in 1910